Monardella beneolens is a rare species of flowering plant in the mint family known by the common name sweet-smelling monardella.

Distribution
Monardella beneolens is endemic to California, where it is known from just a few occurrences in the high peaks of the southern Sierra Nevada. Its habitat includes subalpine mountain forests and alpine rock fields.

Although the plant is rare, it is not likely to experience disturbance or destruction because it lives in such remote habitat.

Description
Monardella beneolens is a hairy, glandular rhizomatous perennial herb growing in a mat or small tuft and producing flowering stems 10 to 30 centimeters long. The long-haired, triangular or oval leaves are under a centimeter long and usually wavy along the edges. The inflorescence is a head of several flowers blooming in a cup of pinkish or pale green bracts. The five-lobed flowers are lavender or pink.

References

External links
 Jepson Manual Treatment - Monardella beneolens
 USDA Plants Profile - Monardella beneolens
 Monardella beneolens - Photo gallery
 Calflora Database: Monardella beneolens (Sweet smelling monardella)
 Jepson Manual eFlora (TJM2) treatment of Monardella beneolens
 UC Photos gallery: Monardella beneolens

Further reading
 Shevock, J. R., B. Ertter, and J. D. Jokerst. (1989). Monardella beneolens (Lamiaceae), a new species from the crest of the southern Sierra Nevada, California. Madroño 36:271-79.

beneolens
Endemic flora of California
Alpine flora
Flora of the Sierra Nevada (United States)
Natural history of Inyo County, California
Natural history of Kern County, California
Natural history of Tulare County, California
Plants described in 1989
Critically endangered flora of California